The Indianapolis Capitals/Cincinnati Wings were a professional ice hockey team that operated for one season in the Central Professional Hockey League (CPHL). Originally named the Indianapolis Capitals, the team started the 1963-64 season playing out of the Fairgrounds Coliseum in Indianapolis, but only 9 games into the season a gas explosion during an ice show destroyed the Indianapolis Coliseum. The Capitals' parent club, the Detroit Red Wings, terminated their lease on the rink and moved the franchise to Cincinnati, Ohio to become the Cincinnati Wings. The Wings relocated to Memphis, Tennessee for the 1964-65 season to become the Memphis Wings.

In 1963-64 the combined Indianapolis/Cincinnati team had a record of 12-53-7-31 and finished in 5th (last) place in the CPHL.

Indianapolis Capitols/Cincinnati Wings roster
Tony Leswick (Head Coach)
Alex Faulkner
Barrie Ross
Bert Marshall
Bill Mitchell
Bob Champoux (goalie)
Bob Cox
Bob Wall
Bryan Campbell
Dennis Kassian
Dennis Rathwell 
Don Chiz
Doug Messier
Earl Heiskala
Frank Hincks
Hank Bassen (goalie)
Harrison Gray (goalie)
Howie Menard
Irv Spencer
Jack Faulkner
Jack McIntyre
Jim Peters
Jim Watson
Joe Daley (goalie)
Ken Laufman
Max Mestinsek
Nick Libett
Norm Beaudin
Pete Shearer
Ray Ross
Richard "Chick" Balon
Roger Lafreniere
Ron Harris
Ron Leopold
Sid Finney
Stuart "Butch" Paul
Wayne Muloin

References

External links
Team profile at Hockeydb.com
SCSR / Cincinnati Wings

Sports teams in Cincinnati
Defunct ice hockey teams in Ohio
Central Professional Hockey League teams
1963 establishments in Indiana
1964 disestablishments in Ohio
Ice hockey clubs established in 1963
Ice hockey clubs disestablished in 1964